John Arbuthnot Du Cane Wilkinson (23 September 1940 – 1 March 2014) was a British Conservative politician. He was educated at Eton College and Churchill College, Cambridge.

Electoral history
He was the member of parliament (MP) for Bradford West from 1970 until February 1974, when he was defeated by the Labour candidate Edward Lyons. He failed to regain the seat against Lyons in the following general election that same year.

In the 1979 general election he was elected as MP for Ruislip-Northwood, succeeding Petre Crowder, where he was re-elected in the successive general elections in 1983, 1987, 1992, 1997 and 2001.

Wilkinson did not stand in the May 2005 general election, and the succeeding MP for Ruislip-Northwood was fellow Conservative, Nick Hurd. By the time of his retirement, Wilkinson was one of the longest-serving Conservative MPs, having served 30 years in Parliament.

Parliamentary career
Wilkinson remained on the backbenches for most of his parliamentary career, apart from two brief periods as a Parliamentary Private Secretary (PPS): to the Minister of State for Industry from 1979 to 1980 and to the Secretary of State for Defence from 1981 to 1982.

A former member of the Royal Air Force (RAF), he spoke frequently in debates on defence and from 1979 to 1990 he was a member of the Parliamentary Assembly of The Western European Union (WEU). He also served as a member of the Parliamentary Assembly of the Council of Europe.

Wilkinson was one of the Maastricht Rebels, from whom the Conservative whip was withdrawn when they voted against legislation to ratify the Maastricht Treaty on European Union. Wilkinson and the other rebels continued to oppose the European policy of Conservative Prime Minister John Major for much of the 1992–97 parliament.

In popular culture
Wilkinson was portrayed by Jasper Jacob in the 2002 BBC production of Ian Curteis's controversial The Falklands Play.

References

External links 
 
 Telegraph obituary

1940 births
2014 deaths
Conservative Party (UK) MPs for English constituencies
Royal Air Force officers
UK MPs 1970–1974
UK MPs 1979–1983
UK MPs 1983–1987
UK MPs 1987–1992
UK MPs 1992–1997
UK MPs 1997–2001
UK MPs 2001–2005
Alumni of Churchill College, Cambridge
People educated at Eton College
Recipients of the Order of the Cross of Terra Mariana, 3rd Class
Members of Parliament for Bradford West
British Eurosceptics